Morten Wetche Frendrup (born 7 April 2001) is a Danish professional footballer who plays as a midfielder for  club Genoa. He has been capped for various Denmark national youth teams.

Frendrup was born in Tuse and played youth football with Tuse IF and Holbæk B&I before starting his professional career with Brøndby IF, where he became the youngest player to debut for the club. He became an established player under manager Niels Frederiksen, and was part of the title-winning team of 2020–21. His performances earned him a move to Serie A club Genoa in February 2022.

He is a Denmark youth international, having appeared for the under-21 team since 2021.

Club career

Brøndby

Early career
Born in Tuse outside Holbæk, Frendrup started playing for local team Tuse IF, before moving to Holbæk B&I. He was only at Holbæk for one year, because he had joined the Brøndby IF academy at under-14 level, which meant that he played for two clubs for a short period. During this time, he commuted several times a week between his home in Tuse and Brøndby, a distance of approximately 60 kilometres. When Frendrup finished primary education, he began attending Brøndby Idrætsefterskole, a five minute walk from the Brøndby IF training ground.

He won the Danish under-15 Cup on 11 May 2016 in a 1–0 win over FC Nordsjælland. At under-17 level, he captained the team to a second-place finish in the league behind winners AGF.

2017–20: Breakthrough
In the summer of 2017, aged 16, Frendrup was included in the first-team training camp in Austria together with fellow academy players Christian Enemark and Andreas Bruus. In December 2017, he signed a new deal with Brøndby, keeping him in the club until the summer of 2020.

On 11 February 2018, Frendrup made his senior debut, aged 16, in a 3–1 win over Lyngby Boldklub in the Danish Superliga. He was brought on as a substitute in the 85th minute, becoming the youngest player to appear for Brøndby, 37 days younger than second on the list, Magnus Warming. On 15 March 2018, Frendrup signed his first professional contract, keeping him at the club until 2021.

During the 2019–20 season, Frendrup started playing more regularly in the fall due to long-term injuries to starters Lasse Vigen, Simon Tibbling and Josip Radošević. His performances during these games were praised, and he subsequently won the Brøndby Player of the Month award for November. On 12 January 2020, Frendrup signed a new three-and-a-half-year contract with Brøndby, running until 2023. He continued his strong performances in the second half of the season and was named Superliga Talent of the Month for June 2020, as well as Brøndby Player of the Month for June and July.

At the end of the season, head coach Niels Frederiksen praised Frendrup as being one of the key players of the Brøndby team during the last half of the season.

2020–21: Danish champions
Frendrup continued as a starter in midfield in Brøndby's 2020–21 campaign. He marked his 50th appearance in all competitions 20 December 2020 as Brøndby beat Horsens 2–1 to go on winter break in first place of the league table.

As the season reached its conclusion, and Brøndby pushed for its first league title in 16 years, Frendrup was sent off in a crucial game against AGF on 20 May 2021. Leaving the pitch in tearful fashion, he eventually saw his team win 2–1. When returning to Brøndby Stadion after the match, Frendrup and the other players were cheered on by fans. Frendrup was sidelined with a suspension for the last game of the season against Nordsjælland, but could see his team win the Danish Superliga title after a 2–0 win.

Frendrup made his European debut on 17 August 2021 in the UEFA Champions League play-off first leg against Red Bull Salzburg, which ended in a 1–2 loss. On 24 October, he scored his first goal in the domestic league, helping the club to a win in the Copenhagen Derby against FC Copenhagen.

Genoa
Frendrup signed for Serie A club Genoa on 30 January 2022, penning a four-and-a-half-year deal. He made his debut for Genoa in a 0–0 away draw against Atalanta on 13 March, during which he started at right-back.

International career
Frendrup was included in the squad for the 2018 UEFA European Under-17 Championship. He played all three of his team's matches as a starter but the Danes failed to advance from the group stage. He gained 13 caps for Denmark under-19, obtained between 2018 and 2020. He wore the captain's armband twice.

On 3 September 2021, Frendrup gained his first cap for the Denmark under-21 team in a 1–1 friendly draw against Greece.

Style of play
A right-footed midfielder, Frendrup has been described as an all-rounder with relentless energy. He has excellent ball-winning abilities, and has been noted to fill in at different positions, including left-back and right-back. He has been likened to former Brøndby midfielder Christian Nørgaard.

Career statistics

Honours

Brøndby
 Danish Superliga: 2020–21
 Danish Cup: 2017–18

References

External links

2001 births
Living people
People from Holbæk Municipality
Danish men's footballers
Danish expatriate men's footballers
Denmark youth international footballers
Denmark under-21 international footballers
Association football midfielders
Holbæk B&I players
Brøndby IF players
Genoa C.F.C. players
Danish Superliga players
Serie A players
Serie B players
Expatriate footballers in Italy
Danish expatriate sportspeople in Italy
Sportspeople from Region Zealand